Kevinia Francis (born 12 April 1978) is a former road cyclist from Antigua and Barbuda. She became Antigua and Barbuda national time trial champion in 2013, and national road race champion in 2014. In 2018, Francis competed in the Atlantic Rowing Race as part of Team Antigua Island Girls, finishing 13th.

References

External links
 

Antigua and Barbuda female cyclists
Living people
1978 births
Place of birth missing (living people)